Streptomyces oryzae is a bacterium species from the genus of Streptomyces which has been isolated from the stem of a rice plant Oryza sativa.

See also 
 List of Streptomyces species

References 

 

oryzae
Bacteria described in 2016